Caryanda spuria is a species of short-horned grasshopper in the family Acrididae. It is found mainly in Indonesia, Singapore, and Malaysia.

References

External links

 

Acrididae
Caryanda (grasshopper)
Orthoptera of Asia